Václav Šmídl (born 18 March 1940) is a Czech former volleyball player who competed for Czechoslovakia in the 1964 Summer Olympics.

He was born in Prague.

In 1964 he was part of the Czechoslovak team which won the silver medal in the Olympic tournament. He played six matches.

References

1940 births
Living people
Czech men's volleyball players
Czechoslovak men's volleyball players
Olympic volleyball players of Czechoslovakia
Volleyball players at the 1964 Summer Olympics
Olympic silver medalists for Czechoslovakia
Olympic medalists in volleyball
Medalists at the 1964 Summer Olympics
Sportspeople from Prague